Yohan Manca is a French film director, writer, actor and producer. He is best known for his work on the film, My Brothers and I (Mes frères et moi).

Career 
Manca co-wrote and co-directed the short film, The Bag (Le sac), along with Julien Dara in 2012. In 2017, his short film, Hédi & Sarah (Hédi et Sarah), nominated at the Syndicat Français de la Critique de cinéma in France.

Manca's debut feature film, My Brothers and I (Mes frères et moi), was selected to compete in the Un Certain Regard section at the Cannes Film Festival in 2021. He didn't attend the Cannes premiere, since he has been accused by the main actress and ex partner Judith Chemla of domestic abuse by throwing a cell phone at her.

Personal life 
In May of 2022, he received an eight-months suspended sentence for domestic violence and abuse over his wife, actress Judith Chemla, with whom he has a daughter.

Filmography

As actor
 2011 : Léa (Short film)
 2014 : Bête noire (Short film)
 2018 : Escapada (Feature film)
 2019 : Call me Matthew (Short film)
 2019 : La vérité si je mens! Les débuts

Awards and nominations

References

External links
 

Living people
1989 births
French film directors
French male film actors
French male screenwriters
French screenwriters
21st-century French male actors